Martin Patterson Hingle (July 19, 1924 – January 3, 2009) was an American character actor who appeared in stage productions and in hundreds of television shows and feature films. His first film was On the Waterfront in 1954. He often played tough authority figures. Hingle was a close friend of Clint Eastwood and appeared in the Eastwood films Hang 'em High, The Gauntlet, and Sudden Impact. He also portrayed Jim Gordon in the Batman film franchise from 1989 to 1997.

Early life
Hingle was born in Miami, Florida (some sources say Denver, Colorado), the son of Marvin Louise (née Patterson), a schoolteacher and musician, and Clarence Martin Hingle, a building contractor. He attended Weslaco High School, where he played tuba in the band. Hingle enlisted in the United States Navy in December 1941, dropping out of the University of Texas. He served on the destroyer USS Marshall during World War II. He returned to the University of Texas after the war and earned a degree in radio broadcasting in 1949. As a Navy Reservist, he was recalled to the service during the Korean War and served on the escort destroyer USS Damato.

Career
Hingle began acting in college, and after graduating, he moved to New York and studied at HB Studio and the American Theatre Wing. In 1952, he became a member of the Actors Studio. This led to his first Broadway show, End as a Man.

On Broadway, Hingle originated the role of Gooper in the original Broadway production of Tennessee Williams's Cat on a Hot Tin Roof (1955). He played the title role in Archibald MacLeish's award-winning Broadway play J.B. (1958), receiving rave reviews. 

In February 1959, while playing J.B. on Broadway, Hingle was seriously injured in an accident. He was trapped in the elevator of his West End Avenue apartment building when it stalled between the second and third floors. The elevator stopped four feet above the landing, within reach, and Hingle tried to jump to the second floor. He missed and fell back down the elevator shaft, plunging 30 feet to the bottom. He fractured his skull, wrist, hip and most of the ribs on his left side. He broke his left leg in three places and lost the little finger on his left hand. 

On the strength of his performance in J.B., Hingle had had been offered the title role of the 1960 film Elmer Gantry, but he lost it to Burt Lancaster because of his injuries. His recovery took months, and at first he could not walk without a cane.  

Hingle appeared in the 1963 Actors Studio production of Strange Interlude, directed by Jose Quintero, and That Championship Season (1972). He earned a Tony Award nomination for his performance in Dark at the Top of the Stairs (1957). In 1997, he played Benjamin Franklin in the Roundabout Theatre revival of the musical 1776, with Brent Spiner and Gregg Edelman.

Hingle's first film role was an uncredited part as bartender Jock in On the Waterfront (1954). Later in his career, he was known for playing judges, police officers and other authority figures. He was a guest star on the early NBC legal drama Justice, based on case histories of the Legal Aid Society of New York, which aired in the 1950s.

Another notable role was as the father of Warren Beatty's character in Splendor in the Grass (1961). Hingle was widely known for portraying the father of Sally Field's title character Norma Rae (1979). He also played manager Colonel Tom Parker in John Carpenter's TV movie Elvis (1979).

Hingle had a long list of television and film credits to his name dating to 1948. Among them were two episodes of The Fugitive (1964), Carol for Another Christmas (1964), Nevada Smith (1966), Mission: Impossible (1967), The Invaders (1967), Hang 'Em High (1968), The Gauntlet (1977), Sudden Impact (1983), Road To Redemption (2001), When You Comin' Back, Red Ryder? (1979), Brewster's Millions (1985), Stephen King's Maximum Overdrive (1986), The Grifters (1990), Citizen Cohn (1992), Cheers (1993), The Land Before Time (1988), Wings (1996), and Shaft (2000). He played Dr. Chapman in seven episodes of the TV series Gunsmoke (1971), and Col. Tucker in the movie Gunsmoke: To the Last Man (1992). In 1963, Hingle guest-starred in an episode of The Twilight Zone, "The Incredible World of Horace Ford", as the title character. He guest-starred in the TV series Matlock, In the Heat of the Night, and Murder, She Wrote. In 1980, he appeared in the short-lived police series Stone with Dennis Weaver.

Hingle played Commissioner Gordon in the 1989 film Batman and its three sequels. He is one of only two actors to appear in the four Batman films from 1989 to 1997; the other is Michael Gough.

In November 2007, he created the Pat Hingle Guest Artist Endowment to enable students to work with visiting professional actors at the University of North Carolina Wilmington.

Personal life
Hingle married Alyce Faye Dorsey on June 3, 1947. They had three children. The couple later divorced. In 1979 Hingle married Julia Wright. He and his second wife had two children.

Hingle died at his home in Carolina Beach, North Carolina, of myelodysplasia on January 3, 2009; he had been diagnosed with the disease in November 2008. He was cremated and his ashes were scattered in the Atlantic Ocean.

Selected TV credits and filmography

References

External links
 
 
 
 
 AP Obituary in The Charlotte Observer

1924 births
2009 deaths
20th-century American male actors
21st-century American male actors
American male film actors
American male stage actors
American male television actors
Deaths from cancer in North Carolina
Deaths from leukemia
Deaths from myelodysplastic syndrome
Male actors from Houston
Male actors from Miami
Military personnel from Florida
Moody College of Communication alumni
United States Navy personnel of World War II
United States Navy personnel of the Korean War
United States Navy reservists